Dra is also the abbreviation for the constellation Draco.

It is formed by the confluence of the Dadès River and Imini River. It flows from the High Atlas mountains, initially south-eastward to Tagounite, and from Tagounite mostly westwards to its mouth in the Atlantic Ocean somewhat north of Tan-Tan. In 1971, the (El) Mansour Eddahabi dam was constructed to service the regional capital of Ouarzazate and to regulate the flow of the Draa. Most of the year the part of the Draa after Tagounite falls dry.

The water from the Draa is used to irrigate palm groves and small farms along the river. The inhabitants of the Draa are called in Arabic Drawa, in Shilha Idrawiyn, the most famous Drawi (singular of Drawa) undoubtedly being Sultan Mohammed ash-Sheikh (1490–1557). Outside of the Draa region this name is mostly used to refer to the dark skinned people of Draa, which make up the largest portion of its inhabitants.

In the first half of the 20th century, the lowest course of the Draa marked the boundary between the French protectorate of Morocco and the area under Spanish rule.

About 225,000 people live in the valley of the Draa, which measures . The valley corresponds with the province of Zagora, created in 1997, in the Souss-Massa-Drâa region. In the province there are 23 villages and two towns: Zagora and Agdz. The village of Tamegroute, near Zagora, is well known for its Zawiya.

The valley contains the Fezouata formations, which are Burgess shale-type deposits dating to the Lower Ordovician, filling an important preservational window between the common Cambrian lagerstätten and the Late Ordovician Soom shale. In the fossilized fauna were numerous organisms previously thought to have died out after the mid-Cambrian.

History

Prehistory

The pre-history of the valley of the Draa goes back thousands of years, as is evidenced by the many rock art engravings or petroglyphs in its surroundings and most of all by the find of the Venus of Tan-Tan. This statue is possibly the oldest human figurine ever found. It dates back more than three hundred thousand years.
From all main periods of the prehistory of the Sahara rock-engravings and rock-paintings have been found. Foum Chenna (Tinzouline), Aït Ouaazik (Asguine Tarna, Tazzarine), and Tiouririne e Tisguinine (Zagora) are amongst the best known sites in the Draa region. At lghir N'tidri between Tagounite and Mhamid al-Ghizlane there is the necropolis of Foum Larjam. The necropolis is the largest of North Africa and consists of several kilometers of tumuli and dates back to prehistoric times. It is one of the few sites where not just rock-drawings but also rock-paintings were found.

Before 1054

The original inhabitants of the Draa river valley were the Haratin, who are also called drawi in Morocco. During the Roman conquest of Mauretania, the Godala Berber tribe fled to the south and enslaved the indigenous Haratin.

The first reference to the Draa River in historical times comes from Hanno, a navigator from Carthage (living around 550 B.C.), who set out for a mission to establish a colony on the west coast of Africa. The Punic text of the record of this journey (known as the Periplus) was engraved in the Temple of Chronos (Baal Hammon) at Carthage. There is only one Greek version, dating perhaps to the 3rd century B.C. These are the opening words of the Periplus:

"The Voyage of Hanno, King of the Carthaginians, to the Libyan regions of the earth, beyond the Pillars of Heracles..."

Having visited the Carthaginian colonies of the Atlas in Morocco, Hanno proceeded southward:

"Leaving this place we arrived at the great river Lixos which comes from Libya. On the banks nomads, the Lixites, were feeding their flocks. We stayed for some time with these people and made friends with them. Upstream from them lived the unfriendly Ethiopians whose land is full of wild beasts and broken up by high mountains where they say the Lixos flows from. They also say that about these mountains dwell the strange-looking Troglodytes. The Lixites claim that they can run faster than horses. Taking Lixite interpreters with us we sailed alongside the desert in a southerly direction for two days, then towards the rising sun for one more day. We then found at the far end of an inlet a little island five stades in circumference. We named it Cerne (Some scholars identify Kerne with the Island of Herne (23°50’N) on the coast of the Sahara) and left settlers there. judging by our journey we reckoned that it must be opposite Carthage, since we had to sail the same distance from Carthage to the Pillars of Hercules as from the Pillars of Hercules to Cerne."

It is generally agreed, the Lixos can be identified as the Draa (28°45’N). The Draa is the largest river in the area, and marks the southernmost limit of cultivable land. This well corresponds to Hanno's account. Certainly the area of Herne was known to the Carthaginians because they would hardly have sent a colony to an unknown place.

The Draa River was also well known to the ancient Romans. It figures on the first world map in history made by Ptolemy (90-168 AD).

When in 680 Uqba ibn Nafi the governor of Ifriqiya came to Morocco with his Arab army, and fought the Masmuda a tribe of the Atlas Mountains, they consequently fled to the Draa river valley; Ukba pursued them and inflicted a crushing defeat on them there. Ukba continued his conquest to the Atlantic Ocean, but on his return march to Kayrawan he was defeated and killed. Thereafter part of the Draa river valley was inhabited by the (Sanhaja) tribe of the Masufa. Their city in this region was called Tiyumetin (modern day Tagounite). From this time until today also the presence of Jewish groups in the Draa valley is attested. Beni Sbih and Beni Hayoune are the villages that remain of that past.

Almoravids

Four centuries later in 1053/54 the Almoravids began their advance on central Morocco. Their very first campaign was on the valley of the Draa river. The power in the valley had been, like in the city of Sijilmasa, for some 50 years in the hands of the Maghrawa (a branch of the Zenata). Here and elsewhere in Morocco this domination was resented. After the Almoravids had conquered the Draa and Sijilmasa they went on to conquer Adaghwast at the southern end of the trans-Sahara route. Yusuf ibn Tashfin took command of North Morocco, while Abu Bakr ibn Umar was leader in the Sahara, Tafilalt and the Draa. Today the remains of an Almoravid fortress can still be seen on the top of the Zagora hill.  There are still groups in the Draa valley that claim descendancy from the Almoravids: the groups of Mrabtine linked to the Arib and the Msouffa, part of the confederation of the Ait Atta. This integration in the empire of the Almoravids was also the first integration of the Draa valley into the whole of Morocco.

Many times, however, the Draa valley was the cradle of revolution and dissent. In 1255 the Beni Ḥassān (the Maqil Arabs) invaded the valley. The Maqil were quickly used by the ruling Berber dynasties. In the country-side however they were deeply disruptive, bringing ruin to many sedentary farmers. The domination of the Maqil in the south lasted to the middle of the 14th century, when a large part of them moved further north and many Berber inhabitants came back. Others like the Roha, Oulad Yahia and Ouled Malek (still a part of the population), which arrived later in the Draa valley, stayed there and continued the fight for the rule of the region. In the 15th century some struggle between Arabs and Berber continued.

Saadi
At this time, the region was the home of many important religious figures and zawiyas. The Draa became part of the marabout movement against the Portuguese who had captured many towns at the Atlantic coast. The Draa made an important comeback in the history of Morocco with the rise of the dynasty of the Saadi or Bani Zaydan as their original name was. Its cradle was in the Draa valley in Tagmadert, the current district of Fezouata between Zagora and Tamegroute. Although there is still a village called Timidert today, some historians think Tagmadert was situated at today's Amezrou, a village next to Zagora. Thanks to the Saadi Dynasty the Draa played an important role in the history of Morocco and the Sahara during the 16th century. In the middle of that century the Saadi Dynasty was at the height of its power. In that time the need for gold was increasing and the sultan Ahmad al-Mansur decided to undertake the conquest of the Sudan in 1590. According to some sources, this conquest had its cause in the events of 1545 when under the reign of Mohammed ash-Sheikh the palm orchards of the Ktawa in the Draa were captured by the Tuareg Oulmiden who were sent by Ishaq I, king of the Sudan.
The campaign for the conquest of the Sudan started in the Ktawa, in the Draa valley. It was in 1591 that the troops gathered and took in food for the passage across the desert. After the military operations the trans-Sahara trade with the Sudan seems to have intensified. In the palm gardens of M'hamid between ksar Bounou and ksar Talha, the ruins of qsar El Alouj are still to be found. This was the old "customs office" where the gold powder arrived from the Sudan. There the gold coins were struck to be sent to Marrakech. With the decline of the Saadi dynasty, especially after the death of Ahmad al-Mansur in 1603, the Draa fell back into anarchy.

Alaouites

During the 17th century the Alaouite dynasty succeeds in establishing its authority in the valley. They conquer the Draa in 1642 where they, like their predecessors, construct numerous ksour. They rule by military force and it is no longer from Tagmadert that they reign the country, but from d'Aghlan, some 20 km North of Zagora. Amezrou, however becomes the seat of the governor. Later in the 17th century Mawlay Ismail Ibn Sharif sends his son to stay in Beni Zouli and also in the zawiya Nasiriyya of Tamegroute in 1675/76. A military expedition sent by Moulay Ismail Ibn Sharif to suppress a rebellion in Mhamid Ghuzlan was led by an Englishman called Thomas Pellow who spent 23 years in Morocco. Pellow wrote a book with an account of his experiences.

In the two next centuries the Draa remains the object of fights between warring (nomadic) tribes. Unfortunately sources have paid too little attention to the sedentary population to give a complete picture of its history and evolution. The officers of the colonising French were almost exclusively interested in the neighbouring resisting warrior tribe of the Ait Atta and neglected the Ktawa of the Draa. It is probable, however, that during these last centuries the nomad tribes  in the Draa valley have integrated with the sedentary. Blood ties (real or imaginary) in which the determining factor whether one belonged to this or that tribe or sub-tribe make place for the determining factor of the qsour where one lives. Alliances are made between particular qsour and nomad groups which offer protection. At the end of the 18th century the power in the Ktawa is divided between three chiefs of three groups: the caid Mohamed in the qsour Beni Hayoun, sheik El Maati in the Beni Sbih and sheik Aamaou in the upper part of the valley. Around 1800 the security of these qsour was threatened by Arab nomads like the Ghenama and the Beni Mohammed and the protection of the Ait Atta was invoked. The price the sedentary groups paid for the protection was a part of their land. This method was custom at many places throughout the valley. Certain qsour however remained independent under the protection of their local chiefs or zawiyas (e.g. qsour Mezguita). Much of the history of the Draa valley is characterised by the warfare between different tribes and most of all by the crimes these tribes committed against the local Drawa population.

20th century
With the coming of the Glaoua at the beginning of the 20th century the domination of many of the ksour by the nomads (like Ait Atta) was brought to an end. Later in the 1930s the French colonisation slowly, but completely, ended the nomad influence, and social structures were radically changed. The jemaa was moved to Tagounite, the new administrative centre, and after a few years the region enjoyed a new kind of autonomy.

Kasbahs

The valley of the Draa is especially famous for its kasbahs. The most famous kasbahs in the region are (north to south):
The kasbah of Tamnougalt (the kasbah of Caïd Ali) and the kasbah of Aït Hammou Ousaid (or Mouha ou Hammou Zayani) near Agdz.
The kasbah of El Caïd Ouslim and the kasbah of Oulad Outhmane in Tamezmout.
The kasbah of Foum Achnna and the kasbah of N'Kob in Tinzouline
The kasbah of Tat Ifli in Beni Zouli.
The kasbah of Amezrou, of Aït Ali Tighramt Ouziguen and of Laglaoui in Zagora
The kasbah of Agouim Nouaadjou and the kasbah of Tagounite in Tagounite.
The kasbah of Aït Bounou, of LaAllouj, the kashbah of Oulad Driss and the kasbah of the Rgabi in M'hamid El Ghuzlane.

Agriculture

The Draa valley is famous as the date basket of Morocco. It grows more than 18 varieties. Fruit trees and vegetables are the main crops but henna is also a well known product of the region. The agriculture is very labour-intensive because it takes place on terraced fields. Seguias (small canals) transport the water from the river to the fields. Like some other ancient Berber oases in North Africa (Siwa, Kufra, Ouargla) the Draa valley was known for its qatarra, a sophisticated system of underground irrigation canals.

Language
Two languages are spoken in the area: a local variety of Colloquial Arabic which is closely related to Hassaniya, and Shilha or Tashelhiyt, a Berber language.

Oases

The Mezguita oasis, with the Agdz and Auriz and south of it the Tamsikht dam
The oasis of Tinzouline, with  Ouled Lagraier, Tinzouline, Ouled Yaoub and a dam south of it
The Ternata oasis with Zagora
The Fezouata oasis with Tamegroute and south of it the Azagha dam
The Ktaoua oasis (English Ktawa) with Tagounite, Blida, Tiraf and the Bounou dam south of it
The oasis of Mhamid el Ghuzlan with Mhamid el Ghuzlan
Because of the terrain the agriculture is very labour-intensive. Dates are the main product, but also cereals, vegetables and henna are cultivated.

Ksour

in the Mezguita

in Tinzouline

in Ternata

in the Fezouata

in the Ktaoua/Ktwawa 
This is the southern stretch of the valley between the Azagha and the Bounou dam near Tagounite. There are 55 villages, mostly consisting of ksour (plural of ksar):

Source : Recensement général du Maroc, 1994 (Recensement général de la population et de l'habitat (RGPH, Haut-Commissariat au Plan du Royaume du Maroc (HCP), septembre 1994)).

Exploration 
The Draa has attracted the attention of a number of notable explorers including Frenchman Charles de Foucauld who travelled throughout Morocco disguised as a Jewish merchant in the 1800s, Jeffrey Tayler who wrote a book about his experiences and most recently Scottish Adventurer, Alice Morrison, who became the first woman to walk the entire length of the Draa in 2019.

Notes

Bibliography

Bahani, A., La nouba d'eau et son évolution dans les palmeraies du Draa Moyen du Maroc: CERES. Les oasis du Maghreb, Tunis: pp. 107–126, 1994
Philip Curtin (ed.), African History, London: Longman, 1988
M. Elfasi (ed.), General History of Africa III, Africa from the Seventh to the 11th century, UNESCO, 1988
Charles de Foucauld, Reconnaissance au Maroc, 1888, 1 vol. in -4 and atlas
Hammoudi, A., Substance and Relation: Water Rights and Water Distribution in the Dra Valley. In: Mayer, A.E. (Ed.), Property, Social Structure, and law in the Modern Middle East. New York: pp. 27–57, 1985
Marmol Caravajal, Africa, 1667 3 vol. in 4
Thomas Pellow; Josephine Grieder, The History of the long captivity and adventures of Thomas Pellow, in South-Barbary : [written by himself], 1973 (repr.of the 1739 edition with a new introd. for the Garland ed. by Josephine Grieder) 
W.D. Seiwert (ed.), Maurische Chronik, München: Trickster Verlag, 1988
Jacques-Meunié, D., Le Maroc Saharien, des origines à 1670. Thèse d'État. 2 tomes, Librairie Klincksieck, Paris, 1982
G. Spillmann, Villes et Tribus du Maroc vol. IX, Tribus Berbères Tome II, Districts et Tribus de la Haute Vallée du Dra, Paris, 1931
Jeffrey Tayler, Valley of the Casbahs, 2004
Ahmed Zainabi, La Vallée du Dra: Développement Alternatif et Action Communautaire, 2001 (Background paper WDR 2003)

External links
Michel, J. (1995). The Invasion of Morocco in 1591... University of Pennsylvania - African Studies Center.

Rivers of Morocco
Rivers of Algeria
Algeria–Morocco border
International rivers of Africa
Geographic history of Morocco
Ramsar sites in Morocco
Border rivers